Al Maktoum Bridge (in Arabic: جسر آل مكتوم; also known in Arabic as جسر المكتوم) is a bridge that crosses Dubai Creek in Dubai, United Arab Emirates. It is one of six crossings on the creek and was the first bridge/crossing in Dubai.  The others are Al Shindagha Tunnel, Floating Bridge, Al Garhoud Bridge and Business Bay Crossing. The Dubai Metro also goes under the creek.

Opened in 1963, this bridge enabled people to cross from Bur Dubai to Deira, or vice versa, without using a boat ferry called Abra or going all the way around Dubai Creek.  To pay for the bridge, a toll was applied to vehicles crossing the creek going from Deira to Bur Dubai.  There was no toll for people travelling in the other direction.  Once the bridge was fully paid for in 1973, the toll was removed.

The bridge, and roads leading to it, underwent a widening in 2007.  The bridge was widened to increase the bridge's capacity and to ease congestion. The new lanes were opened on 7 November 2007, and increased the capacity to 9,500 vehicles per hour.

The road toll (called Salik), was re-introduced on the Al Maktoum Bridge on 9 September 2008 for both directions. The toll will not be charged when the Floating Bridge is closed (from 10pm to 6am from Saturday to Thursday).

References

Bridges in Dubai
Bridges completed in 1962
Former toll bridges